Radium girl may refer to:

 Radium girls, female workers at factories making glowing radium painted products, who suffered from radium jaw and death
 Radium Girls (film), a film about the factory workers
 Radium Girl, a stage magic illusion

See also
 The Radium Woman, a biography book about Marie Curie, the discoverer of radium
 Radium (disambiguation)